"Club Tropicana" is a song by English pop duo Wham!, released in 1983 on Innervision Records. It was written by members George Michael and Andrew Ridgeley.

History
"Club Tropicana" was written in 1981 in Ridgeley's living room, before the band or bandname had been fully established, and was the second Wham! song they came up with after the initial "Wham Rap!". Although only half finished at the time of recording, it became one of the three home demos hastily made on a hired porta-studio which led to their first record contract with Innervision Records. The initial song inspiration came from their excitement over the glamour and escapism of the then burgeoning New Romantic club scene, and George, Andrew and Shirlie's occasional visits to one such club in London, Le Beat Route. The song's lyrical theme was then expanded to also include the hedonism of summery Club 18-30 holidays, whilst musically fusing a Latin jazz rhythm with a groove inspired by the Gap Band's "Burn Rubber on Me".

Synopsis
The song was a mild departure from Wham!'s previous singles, which had all been motivated by social or political issues. "Club Tropicana", however, was a satire of the boom for cheap package holidays for younger, single people of a hedonistic nature. It was specifically seen in the UK as a swipe at the very popular Club 18-30 scheme.

Chart performance
The song was released in July 1983 and peaked at No. 4 in the UK, going on to become the 39th best selling single of 1983. It was the fourth and final single to be taken from the album Fantastic. Wham! then achieved four UK No. 1 singles before splitting at their height in 1986.

Other releases
The song was also included on the compilation album The Final and on Michael's greatest hits album Twenty Five.

B-side
The B-side, "Blue (Armed with Love)", is a semi-instrumental dub track, which was cut once the Fantastic album was finished – George Michael was involved as sole producer. Michael and Ridgeley spent the 11 hours they had available putting the track together, but it wasn't fully finished and ended up being released in its incomplete state as a B-side.
During their "Club Fantastic" tour in late 1983 and in 1985 in China, they performed a more developed version of this song live, complete with sung verses. This version was released as "Blue (Live in China)" on their 1986 LP Music from the Edge of Heaven as well as the B-side of 1985's single release of "Last Christmas".

Music video
A video directed by Duncan Gibbins was made at Pikes Hotel in Ibiza, owned by Tony Pike with scenes of George and Andrew on the beach, making eyes at bikini-clad girls played by their backing singers Dee C. Lee and Shirlie Holliman. They are also seen relaxing by a pool and sipping cocktails, with Michael lounging on a lilo in white Speedos, along with the famous scene of trumpet-playing taking place in the pool itself. A twist in the sexual tension between the two men and two women is revealed at the end, when it turns out that Michael and Ridgeley are airline pilots and Dee and Shirlie are stewardesses.

It was during this trip to Ibiza that George had his first physical homosexual encounter, confirming to himself that he was definitely either homosexual or bisexual. He confided first in Shirlie Holliman and then in Andrew, who both were OK with it.

As of May 2022, the music video has received more than 29 million views on YouTube. The music video was used as an homage for Lewis Capaldi's music video for "Forget Me" in 2022.

Track listing

Charts

Weekly charts

Year-end charts

Certifications and sales

References

1983 songs
1983 singles
Wham! songs
Songs written by George Michael
Song recordings produced by George Michael
Innervision Records singles
Satirical songs
Music videos shot in Ibiza
Songs written by Andrew Ridgeley